Vexillum bouteti is a species of sea snail, a marine gastropod mollusk, in the family Costellariidae, the ribbed miters.

Description
the length of the shell attains 16 mm.

Distribution
This marine species occurs in French Polynesia.

References

 Salisbury, R. A.; Herrmann, M. (2012). Three new Costellariidae species (Gastropoda) described from French Polynesia. Novapex. 13(3-4): 107-111.

bouteti
Gastropods described in 2012